Per Gustav "Pelle" Lindeman (born 20 December 1956) is a Swedish curler.

In 1989 he was inducted into the Swedish Curling Hall of Fame.

Teams

Men's

Mixed

References

External links

Living people
1956 births
Swedish male curlers
Swedish curling champions